A District Chief Executive (DCE) is an appointed public servant who heads a district in Ghana. It is an official and nationally recognized position and is similar to that of a mayor of a city in other countries. The responsibilities and duties of a district chief executive are enshrined in the Constitution of Ghana. There are 212 districts in Ghana with some being municipal and other metropolis.

References

Ministries and Agencies of State of Ghana